Voodoo-U is the second studio album from Belgian electronic band Lords of Acid.  It was released in 1994 on Rick Rubin's American Recordings label.  The album begins the band's move from the rave sounds of predecessor Lust to a heavier, industrial music style.  Lyrically the band maintains their outrageous sex-and-drugs themes.  Lead vocal duties on Voodoo-U are performed by Ruth McArdle and backing vocals by Jade 4U, while some songs feature only Jade 4U.  The album's first single, "The Crablouse", is an ode to pubic lice.

The album's cover art was available in both a censored and uncensored version — the uncensored version featuring nude, fluorescent-orange-colored lesbian devils having a sexual orgy.  The artwork was designed by American hot-rod artist Coop.

Although not as universally praised as debut album Lust, Voodoo-U earned positive reviews from music critics.  With this album Lords of Acid ventured on their first world headlining tour with a full backing band.

Voodoo-U was re-issued again with bonus tracks ("Young Boys Go To Studio 54", "Lords on 45" "Crablouse" [Van Acker Mix], "Real Thing"). As was the case with Lust, Voodoo-U was re-issued in 2001 as a "Stript" version, with all vocals removed.

"Young Boys" was included in the motion picture soundtrack for Virtuosity.  "The Crablouse" was played on the TV show Top Gear 2010 Specials, Episode 1: American Road Trip and was also featured in the teaser trailer for the 2011 film Sucker Punch. "Drink My Honey" is featured in the motion picture soundtrack for the 1995 film Strange Days.

Track listing

References

1994 albums
Lords of Acid albums
Albums produced by Rick Rubin